Order of Merits in Defense and Security is the sixth highest state order of Serbia.
The order is awarded by the decree of the President of Serbia on special occasions. It is awarded for Above-average, exemplary and honorable performance of duties and tasks in the fields of defense and security.

Ranks
Order of Merits in Defense and Security has three classes.

References

Awards established in 2009